William Stanley Kirkman (born 14 February 1961 in Launceston, Tasmania) was an Australian cricketer who played four first-class matches for the Tasmanian Tigers between 1982 and 1987. He also played one List A cricket match for the side. He was a medium-fast bowler.

See also
 List of Tasmanian representative cricketers

References

External links

1961 births
Living people
Australian cricketers
Tasmania cricketers
Cricketers from Launceston, Tasmania